Walter Schuster (2 June 1929 – 13 January 2018) was an Austrian alpine skier who competed in the 1956 Winter Olympics.

He was born in Lermoos.

In 1956 he won the bronze medal in the giant slalom event. He also participated in the downhill competition but did not finish the race.

References 
 

1929 births
2018 deaths
Austrian male alpine skiers
Olympic alpine skiers of Austria
Alpine skiers at the 1956 Winter Olympics
Olympic bronze medalists for Austria
Olympic medalists in alpine skiing
Medalists at the 1956 Winter Olympics
People from Reutte District